Montgomery County is the most populous county in the state of Maryland. As of the 2020 census, the county's population was 1,062,061, increasing by 9.3% from 2010. The county seat and largest municipality is Rockville, although the census-designated place of Germantown is the most populous place within the county. Montgomery County, which adjoins Washington, D.C., is part of the Washington–Arlington–Alexandria, DC–VA–MD–WV metropolitan statistical area, which in turn forms part of the Baltimore–Washington combined statistical area. Most of the county's residents live in unincorporated locales, of which the most urban are Silver Spring and Bethesda, although the incorporated cities of Rockville and Gaithersburg are also large population centers, as are many smaller but significant places.

The average household income in Montgomery County is among the highest in the United States. It has the highest percentage (29.2%) of residents over 25 years of age who hold post-graduate degrees. Like other inner-suburban Washington, D.C. counties, Montgomery County contains many major U.S. government offices, scientific research and learning centers, and business campuses.

Etymology

The Maryland state legislature named Montgomery County after Richard Montgomery; the county was created from lands that had at one point or another been part of Frederick County. On September 6, 1776, Thomas Sprigg Wootton from Rockville, Maryland, introduced legislation, while serving at the Maryland Constitutional Convention, to create lower Frederick County as Montgomery County. The name, Montgomery County, along with the founding of Washington County, Maryland, after George Washington, was the first time in American history that counties and provinces in the thirteen colonies were not named after British referents. The name use of Montgomery and Washington County were seen as further defiance to Great Britain during the American Revolutionary War. The county's nickname of "MoCo" is derived from "Montgomery County".

The county's motto, adopted in 1976, is "Gardez Bien", a phrase meaning "Watch Well". The county's motto is also the motto of its namesake's family.

History

Prior to 1688, the first tract of land in what is now Montgomery County was granted by Charles I in a charter to the first Lord Baltimore (head of the Calvert family).  Much later, the creation of Montegomery county became the goal of colonist, Thomas S. Wootton when, on August 31, 1776, he introduced a measure to form a new county from Frederick County, Maryland to aid area residents in simplifying their business affairs. The measure passed, thus creating the new political entity of Montgomery County in the Maryland Colony.

Geography

Montgomery County lies entirely inside the Piedmont plateau. The topography is generally rolling. Elevations range from a low of near sea level along the Potomac River to about 875 feet in the northernmost portion of the county north of Damascus. Relief between valley bottoms and hilltops is several hundred feet.

When Montgomery County was created in 1776, its boundaries were defined as "beginning at the east side of the mouth of Rock Creek on Potowmac river [sic], and running with the said river to the mouth of Monocacy, then with a straight line to Par's spring, from thence with the lines of the county to the beginning".

The county's boundary forms a sliver of land at the far northern tip of the county that is several miles long and averages less than 200 yards wide. In fact, a single house on Lakeview Drive and its yard is sectioned by this sliver into three portions, each separately contained within Montgomery, Frederick and Howard Counties. These jurisdictions and Carroll County meet at a single point at Parr's Spring on Parr's Ridge.

Adjacent counties
 Frederick County (northwest)
 Carroll County (north)
 Howard County (northeast)
 Prince George's County (southeast)
 Washington, D.C. (south)
 Fairfax County, Virginia (southwest)
 Loudoun County, Virginia (west)

National protected areas
 Chesapeake and Ohio Canal National Historical Park (part)
 Clara Barton National Historic Site
 George Washington Memorial Parkway (part)

Climate
Montgomery County lies within the northern portions of the humid subtropical climate. It has four distinct seasons, including hot, humid summers and cool winters.

Thunderstorms are common during the summer months, and account for the majority of the average 35 days with thunder per year. Heavy precipitation is most common in summer thunderstorms, but drought periods are more likely during these months because summer precipitation is more variable than winter.

The average summer (June–July–August) afternoon maximum is about  while the morning minimums average .

During a particularly snowy winter, Damascus received  during the 2009–2010 season.

Demographics

Since the 1970s, the county has had in place a Moderately Priced Dwelling Unit (MPDU) zoning plan that requires developers to include affordable housing in any new residential developments that they construct in the county. The goal is to create socioeconomically mixed neighborhoods and schools so the rich and poor are not isolated in separate parts of the county. Developers who provide for more than the minimum amount of MPDUs are rewarded with permission to increase the density of their developments, which allows them to build more housing and generate more revenue. Montgomery County was one of the first counties in the U.S. to adopt such a plan, but many other areas have since followed suit.

Montgomery County is by far one of the most ethnically and culturally diverse counties in the United States; four of the ten most culturally diverse cities and towns in the U.S. are in Montgomery County: Gaithersburg, ranking second; Germantown, ranking third; Silver Spring, ranking fourth; and Rockville, ranking ninth. Gaithersburg, Germantown, and Silver Spring all rank as more culturally diverse than New York City, San Jose, and Oakland. Maryland overall is one of six minority-majority states, and the only minority-majority state on the East Coast.

2020 census

Note: the US Census treats Hispanic/Latino as an ethnic category. This table excludes Latinos from the racial categories and assigns them to a separate category. Hispanics/Latinos can be of any race.

2010 census
As of the 2010 United States census, there were 971,777 people, 357,086 households, and 244,898 families living in the county. The racial makeup of the county was 57.5% White, 17.2% Black or African American, 13.9% Asian, 0.4% American Indian, 0.1% Pacific islander, 7.0% from other races, and 4.0% from two or more races. Those of Hispanic or Latino origin made up 17.0% of the population. In terms of ancestry, 10.7% were German, 9.6% were Irish, 7.9% were English, 4.9% were Italian, 3.5% were Russian, 3.1% were Polish, 2.9% were American and 2% were French. People of Central American descent made up 8.1% of Montgomery County, with Salvadoran Americans constituting 5.4% of the county's population. Over 52,000 people of Salvadoran descent lived in Montgomery County, with Salvadoran Americans comprising approximately 32% of the county's Hispanic and Latino population. People of South American descent make up 3.8% of the county, with Peruvian Americans being the largest South American community, constituting 1.2% of the county's population.

Of the 357,086 households, 35.7% had children under the age of 18 living with them, 53.4% were married couples living together, 11.3% had a female householder with no husband present, 31.4% were non-families, and 25.0% of all households were made up of individuals. The average household size was 2.70 and the average family size was 3.22. The median age was 38.5 years.

The median income for a household in the county was $93,373 and the median income for a family was $111,737. Males had a median income of $71,841 versus $55,431 for females. The per capita income for the county was $47,310. About 4.0% of families and 6.0% of the population were below the poverty line, including 7.2% of those under age 18 and 6.3% of those age 65 or over.

2000 census
As of the 2000 United States census, there were 873,058 people living in the county. The racial makeup of the county was 65.0% white, 15.1% Black or African American, 11.3% Asian, 0.3% American Indian, 0.1% Pacific islander, 5.0% from other races, and 3.5% from two or more races. Those of Hispanic or Latino origin made up 11.5% of the population.

There were 324,565 households, of which 35% had children under the age of 18 living with them, 55.2% were married couples living together, 10.5% had a female householder with no husband present, and 30.9% were non-families. Of all households, 24.4% were made up of individuals, and 7.7% had someone living alone who was 65 years of age or older. The average household size was 2.66 and the average family size was 3.19.

25.4% of the population was under the age of 18, 6.9% from 18 to 24, 32.3% from 25 to 44, 24.2% from 45 to 64, and 11.2% who were 65 years of age or older. The median age was 37 years. For every 100 females, there were 92.1 males. For every 100 females age 18 and over, there were 88.1 males.

Montgomery County has the tenth-highest median household income in the United States, and the second highest in the state after Howard County as of 2011. The median household income in 2007 was $89,284 and the median family income was $106,093. Males had a median income of $66,415 versus $52,134 for females. The per capita income for the county was $43,073. About 3.3% of families and 4.6% of the population were below the poverty line, including 4.6% of those under age 18 and 4.6% of those age 65 or over.

2014 estimates
The United States Census Bureau estimated the county's population was 1,030,447 as of 2014. If it were a city, it would be the tenth-most-populous city in the U.S. after San Jose, California and Austin, Texas.

The ethnic makeup of the county was estimated to be the following in 2013:
 62.6% White (47.0% Non-Hispanic White)
 18.6% Black
 14.9% Asian
 0.7% Native American
 0.1% Native Hawaiian or Pacific Islander
 3.1% Two or more races

In addition, 18.3% were Hispanic or Latino, of any race.

People who were born on continent of Africa are 6% of the county's total residents. The plurality of these were born in Ethiopia. People from China are the fastest-growing immigrant population in the county; people from Ethiopia are the county's second-fastest-growing immigrant population.

2016 estimates
The United States Census Bureau estimated the county's population as 1,043,863 as of 2016.

The race and Hispanic original of the county's residents was estimated to be the following as of 2016:
 60.9% White (44.7% Non-Hispanic White)
 19.5% Black
 15.5% Asian
 0.7% Native American
 0.1% Native Hawaiian or Pacific Islander
 3.4% Two or more races

In addition, 19.1% were Hispanic or Latino, of any race.

Of residents age 25 or older, 91.2% have graduated high school, and 57.1% had a bachelor's degree.

Of the county's population, 32.6% were born outside the United States.

44,718 veterans lived in the county in 2016.

Of residents age 5 or older, 39.8% spoke a language other than English at home in 2016.

2018 estimates 
As of July 1, 2018 The United States Census Bureau estimates the population of the county to be 1,052,567 residents.

The race and Hispanic origin of the county's residents are estimated to be:
 60.2% White (43.4% Non-Hispanic White) (9.1% German, 8.3% Irish, 6.3% English, 4.3% Italian, 3.7% American, 2.9% Polish, 2.8% Russian)
 19.9% African-American or Black (1.5% Ethiopian)
 19.9% Hispanic or Latino (6.80% Salvadoran, 1.71% Mexican, 1.24% Peruvian, 1.22% Guatemalan, 1.06% Honduran, 0.92% Colombian, 0.85% Puerto Rican, 0.70% Dominican)
 15.6% Asian (4.10% Chinese, 3.68% Indian, 1.62% Korean, 1.42% Vietnamese, 1.22% Filipino, 0.43% Pakistani, 0.31% Japanese, 0.26% Taiwanese, 0.21% Sri Lankan)
 3.4% Two or more races
 0.7% American Indian or Alaskan Native
 0.1% Native Hawaiian or Pacific Islander

The age of the county's residents are estimated to be:
 6.3% Persons under 5 years
 23.3% Persons under 18 years
 15.5% Persons 65 years and over.

An estimated 51.6% of the population is female.

The number of housing units is estimated to be 390,664.

Religion
Of Montgomery County's residents, 14% are Catholic, 5% are Baptist, 3% are Methodist, 1% are Presbyterian, 1% are Episcopalian, 1% are part of the Latter Day Saint movement, 1% are Lutheran, 6% are of another Christian faith, 3% are Jewish, 1% follows Islam, and 1% are of an eastern faith. Overall, 41% of the county's residents are affiliated with a religion.

Montgomery County has the largest Jewish population in the state of Maryland, accounting for 45% of Maryland Jews. According to the Berman Jewish DataBank, Montgomery County has a Jewish population of 105,400 people, around 10% of the county's population. The Washington metropolitan area, with 295,500 Jews, has become the third-largest Jewish population in the United States.

Economy
Montgomery County is an important business and research center. It is the epicenter for biotechnology in the Mid-Atlantic region. Montgomery County, as third largest biotechnology cluster in the U.S., holds a large cluster and companies of large corporate size within the state. Biomedical research is carried out by institutions including Johns Hopkins University's Montgomery County Campus (JHU MCC), and the Howard Hughes Medical Institute (HHMI). Federal government agencies in Montgomery County engaged in related work include the Food and Drug Administration (FDA), the National Institutes of Health (NIH), the Uniformed Services University of the Health Sciences (USUHS), and the Walter Reed Army Institute of Research.

Many large firms are based in the county, including Coventry Health Care, Lockheed Martin, Marriott International, Host Hotels & Resorts, Travel Channel, Ritz-Carlton, Robert Louis Johnson Companies (RLJ Companies), Choice Hotels, MedImmune, TV One, BAE Systems Inc., Hughes Network Systems and GEICO.

Other U.S. federal government agencies based in the county include the National Oceanic and Atmospheric Administration (NOAA), Nuclear Regulatory Commission (NRC), U.S. Department of Energy (DOE), the National Institute of Standards and Technology (NIST), the Walter Reed National Military Medical Center (WRNMMC), and the U.S. Consumer Product Safety Commission (CPSC).

Downtown Bethesda and Silver Spring are the largest urban business hubs in the county; combined, they rival many major city cores.

Top employers
According to the county's comprehensive annual financial reports, the top employers by number of employees in the county are the following. "NR" indicates the employer was not ranked among the top ten employers that year.

Politics and government

Montgomery County was granted a charter form of government in 1948.

The present County Executive/County Council form of government of Montgomery County dates to November 1968 when the voters changed the form of government from a County Commission/County Manager system, as provided in the original 1948 home rule Charter.

The Montgomery County government had a surplus of $654million for the fiscal year ended June 30, 2021.

County executives
The office of the county executive was established in 1970. The first executive was James P. Gleason. The current executive is Marc Elrich, who was sworn in for his first term on December 3, 2018.

Legislative body
 

The County Council is the legislative branch of Montgomery County.  It has eleven members who serve four-year terms. All are elected at the same time by the voters of Montgomery County. As of January 2023, all 11 members on the council are Democrats.  The council meets weekly at the county seat of Rockville—the 6th Floor of the Stella B. Werner Council Office Building.

The members of the County Council as of 2022 are:

The most recent Republican serving on the Montgomery County Council, Howard A. Denis of District 1 (Potomac/Bethesda), lost re-election in 2006. Since then, all Council members have been Democrats.

Law enforcement

County police 
The Montgomery County Police Department (MCPD) provides the full spectrum of policing services to the entire county. It was founded in 1922 and is headquartered in Gaithersburg, Maryland. It consists of around 1,300 sworn officers and 650 support personnel, split into 6 districts throughout the county. The department also provides assistance to other nearby departments, such as the Metropolitan Police Department of the District of Columbia and the Prince George's County Police Department, if requested.

County sheriff's office 
The Montgomery County Sheriff's Office (MCSO) is a nationally accredited U.S. law enforcement agency and acts as the enforcement arm of the courts in the county. All of its deputy sheriffs are fully certified law enforcement officials with full authority of arrest. The office was created in July 1777 and is the oldest law enforcement agency in Montgomery County. It is headquartered in Rockville, Maryland. It was nationally accredited in 1995, the first county sheriff's office in Maryland to be so. The MCSO has authorized over 165 employees consisting of sworn law enforcement officers and civilian support staff. The office is headed by the sheriff, who has been elected every four years since the 1920s. The current Sheriff is Maxwell C.Uy - elected in December of 2022, Sheriff Uy is the 62nd Sheriff and the first Asian American to hold that Office.

Other agencies 
Several cities including Rockville and Gaithersburg maintain their own police departments to complement MCPD. Maryland State Police patrol the Beltway and I-270, and they assist county and city police in investigation of some major crimes.

Budget
Montgomery County has a budget of $2.3 billion. Approximately $1.48 billion are invested in Montgomery County Public Schools and $128 million in Montgomery College.

Bi-county agencies
Montgomery and Prince George's counties share a bi-county planning and parks agency in the Maryland-National Capital Park and Planning Commission (M-NCPPC) and a public bi-county water and sewer utility in the Washington Suburban Sanitary Commission (WSSC).

LGBTIQ+ bill of rights
In October 2020, the Montgomery County Council unanimously passed an ordinance that implemented an LGBTIQ+ bill of rights.

Liquor control

Montgomery County is an alcoholic beverage control county. Beer and wine may also be sold in private stores.

History
Until 1964, only three restaurants in the county had liquor licenses to serve liquor by the drink. The county stopped issuing liquor licenses to all other restaurants under a law that had existed since Prohibition.

Following a voter referendum, restaurants and bars could apply for county permits to sell liquor by the drink. The dry towns of Kensington, Poolesville, and Takoma Park were allowed to keep their own bans in place.

Anchor Inn in Wheaton was the first establishment to serve liquor in the county under the new law.

Other elected positions
James A. Bonifant is the Administrative Judge of the Circuit Court. Karen A. Bushell is the Clerk of the Circuit Court. Joseph M. Griffin is the Register of Wills. Maxwell C. Uy is the Sheriff. John McCarthy is the State's Attorney.

Federal representation
In the 118th Congress, Montgomery is represented in the U.S. House of Representatives by Glenn Ivey (D) of the 4th district, David Trone (D) of the 6th district, and Jamie Raskin (D) of the 8th district.

Mongomery County is one of the most consistently Democratic counties in Maryland. Before 1928, the County never voted Republican. In total, it has only voted Republican 8 times. The Democratic presidential candidate has won Montgomery County in every presidential election since 1988. In 2020, Donald Trump turned in the worst showing for a Republican in 152 years, not even managing to reach 20% of the vote.

|}

Transportation

Roads

Poor transportation was a hindrance for Montgomery County's farmers who wanted to transport their crops to market in the early 18th century. Montgomery County's first roads, often barely adequate, were built by the 18th century.

One early road connected Frederick and Georgetown. There was a road that connected Georgetown and the mouth of the Monocacy River. Plans to continue the road to Cumberland did not come to fruition. Another road connected the Montgomery County Courthouse with Sandy Spring and Baltimore, and one other road connected the courthouse with Bladensburg and Annapolis.

The county's first turnpike was chartered in 1806, but its construction began in 1817. In 1828, the turnpike was completed, running from Georgetown to Rockville. It was the first paved road in Montgomery County.

In 1849, the Seventh Street Turnpike (now called Georgia Avenue) was extended from Washington to Brookeville. The Colesville–Ashton Turnpike was built in 1870 (now parts of Colesville Road, Columbia Pike, and New Hampshire Avenue).

The United States Army Corps of Engineers built the Washington Aqueduct between 1853 and 1864, to supply water from Great Falls to Washington. The aqueduct was covered in 1875, and it became known as Conduit Road. The Union Arch Bridge, which carries the aqueduct across Cabin John Creek, was the longest single-arch bridge in the world at the time it was completed in 1864. The road is now named MacArthur Boulevard.

Major Highways and Roads

Bus
Montgomery County operates its own bus public transit system, known as Ride On. Major routes closer to its rail service area are also covered by WMATA's Metrobus service.

The county began building a bus rapid transit (BRT) system along US 29 in 2018. The system has been providing service between Silver Spring and Burtonsville since 2020; more routes are planned.

The Corridor Cities Transitway is a proposed BRT line that would provide an extension of the Red Line corridor from Gaithersburg to Germantown, and eventually to Frederick County.

Rail
Montgomery County is served by three passenger rail systems, with a fourth line under construction.

Amtrak, the U.S. national passenger rail system, operates its Capitol Limited to Rockville, between Washington Union Station and Chicago Union Station.

The Brunswick line of the MARC commuter rail system makes stops at Silver Spring, Kensington, Garrett Park, Rockville, Washington Grove, Gaithersburg, Metropolitan Grove, Germantown, Boyds, Barnesville, and Dickerson, where the line splits into its Frederick and Martinsburg branches.

Both suburban arms of the Red Line of the Washington Metro serve Montgomery County. It follows the CSX right of way to the west, roughly paralleling Route 355 from Friendship Heights to Shady Grove. The eastern side runs between the two tracks of the CSX right of way from Washington Union Station to Silver Spring, and roughly parallels Georgia Avenue, from Silver Spring to Glenmont.

The Purple Line, a light rail system, is currently under construction and is scheduled to open in 2026. The line will run in a generally east-west direction, connecting Montgomery and Prince George's Counties near the Beltway, with 21 stations. The Purple Line will connect directly with four Metro stations, MARC trains and Amtrak.

Air
The Montgomery County Airpark (FAA GAI, ICAO KGAI), a general aviation facility in Gaithersburg, is the major airport in the county. Davis Airport (FAA Identifier W50), a privately owned airstrip, is located in Laytonsville on Hawkins Creamery Road. Commercial air service is provided at the nearby Ronald Reagan Washington National, Washington Dulles International, and BWI Airports.

Education
Education in the county is provided by Montgomery County Public Schools, Montgomery College and other institutions.

Montgomery County Public Schools

Elementary and secondary public schools are operated by the Montgomery County Public Schools (MCPS). The county public school system is the largest school district in Maryland, serving about 162,000 students with 13,000 teachers and 10,000 support staff. The public school system operating budget for Fiscal Year 2019 is $2.6 billion.

MCPS operates under the jurisdiction of an elected Board of Education. Its current members are:

MCPS conducted its first 'data deletion week' in 2019, purging its databases of unnecessary student information. Parents said they hoped to shield children from being held accountable in adulthood for youthful mistakes, as well as to guard them from exploitation by what one parent termed "the student data surveillance industrial complex".The district also requires tech companies to annually delete data they collect on schoolchildren. In December 2019 it said GoGuardian had sent formal certification that it had deleted its data, but the district was still waiting for confirmation from Google.

Montgomery College

The county is also served by Montgomery College, a public, open access community college that has a budget of US$315 million for FY2020. The county has no public university of its own, but the state university system does operate a facility called Universities at Shady Grove in Rockville that provides access to baccalaureate and Master's level programs from several of the state's public universities.

Montgomery County Public Libraries

The Montgomery County Public Libraries (MCPL) system includes 23 individual libraries, and had a budget $38 million for 2015.

Culture

Religion
Montgomery County is religiously diverse. Of Montgomery County's population, according to the Association of Religion Data Archives, in 2010, 13% was Catholic, 5% was Baptist, 4% was Evangelical Protestant, 3% was Jewish, 3% was Methodist/Pietist, 2% was Adventist, 2% was Presbyterian, 1% was Episcopalian/Anglican, 1% was Mormon, 1% was Muslim, 1% was Lutheran, 1% was Eastern Orthodox, 1% was Pentecostal, 1% was Buddhist, and 1% was Hindu.

Montgomery County is the most religiously diverse county in the US outside of New York City. A 2020 census by the Public Religion Research Institute (unconnected to the official US census) calculates a religious diversity score of 0.880 for Montgomery County, where 1 represents complete diversity (each religious group of equal size) and 0 a total lack of diversity. Only two other counties in the US have higher diversity scores than Montgomery County, both in urban New York.

The Seventh-day Adventist Church maintains its General Conference headquarters in Silver Spring in Montgomery County.

Sports
The county is home to the National Women's Soccer League team Washington Spirit, a professional soccer team that played its home games at the Maryland SoccerPlex sports complex in Boyds. In 2021, the Spirit will play its seven home games at Audi Field, in Washington, D.C. and five home games at Segra Field in Leesburg, Virginia. Starting in 2022, the team will work to maximize the number of games played at Audi Field.

Bethesda's Congressional Country Club has hosted four Major Championships, including three playings of the U.S. Open, most recently in 2011 which was won by Rory McIlroy. The Club also hosts the Quicken Loans National, an annual event on the PGA Tour which benefits the Tiger Woods Foundation. Previously, neighboring TPC at Avenel hosted the Booz Allen Classic.

The award-winning Members Club at Four Streams is located on a former farm in Beallsville, Maryland.

The Bethesda Big Train, Rockville Express, and Silver Spring–Takoma Thunderbolts all play college level wooden bat baseball in the Cal Ripken Collegiate Baseball League.

Montgomery County is home of the Montgomery County Swim League, a youth (ages 4–18) competitive swimming league composed of ninety teams based at community pools throughout the county.

The King Farm Park in Rockville, open and accessible 24/7 without cost, provides a first-class 16-station Bankshot Playcourt, the Home Court for the Rockville based Bankshot Sports Organization advocating "Total-mix diversity based on Universal Design." Hundreds of communities provide Bankshot Playcourts mainstreaming differently-able participants in community sports. Bankshot basketball Playcourts are also at Montrose park, the JCC among other locations.

Montgomery County Agricultural Fair

Since 1949 the Montgomery County Agricultural Fair, the largest in the state, showcases farm life in the county. The week long event offers family events, carnival rides, live animals, entertainment and food. Visitors can also view entries of canned and baked goods, clothing, quilts and produce from local county farmers.

Communities

Cities
 Gaithersburg
 Rockville (county seat)
 Takoma Park

Towns

 Barnesville
 Brookeville
 Chevy Chase
 Chevy Chase View
 Chevy Chase Village
 Garrett Park
 Glen Echo
 Kensington
 Laytonsville
 Poolesville
 Somerset
 Washington Grove

Villages
 Chevy Chase, Village of, Section 3
 Chevy Chase, Village of, Section 5
 Martin's Additions
 North Chevy Chase

Special Tax Districts
Occupying a middle ground between incorporated and unincorporated areas are Special Tax Districts, quasi-municipal unincorporated areas created by legislation passed by either the Maryland General Assembly or the county. The Special Tax Districts generally have limited purposes, such as providing some municipal services or improvements to drainage or street lighting. Special Tax Districts lack home rule authority and must petition their cognizant governmental entity for changes affecting the authority of the district. The four incorporated villages of Montgomery County and the town of Chevy Chase View were originally established as Special Tax Districts. Four Special Tax Districts remain in the county:
 Drummond
 Oakmont

Census-designated places

Unincorporated areas are also considered as towns by many people and listed in many collections of towns, but they lack local government. Various organizations, such as the United States Census Bureau, the United States Postal Service, and local chambers of commerce, define the communities they wish to recognize differently, and since they are not incorporated, their boundaries have no official status outside the organizations in question. The Census Bureau recognizes the following census-designated places in the county:

 Ashton-Sandy Spring
 Aspen Hill
 Bethesda
 Brookmont
 Burtonsville
 Cabin John
 Calverton (partly in Prince George's County)
 Chevy Chase
 Clarksburg
 Cloverly
 Colesville
 Damascus
 Darnestown
 Fairland
 Forest Glen
 Four Corners
 Germantown
 Glenmont
 Hillandale (partly in Prince George's County)
 Kemp Mill
 Layhill
 Leisure World
 Montgomery Village
 North Bethesda
 North Potomac
 Olney
 Potomac
 Redland
 Silver Spring
 South Kensington
 Travilah
 White Oak
 Wheaton

Unincorporated communities
 Ashton
 Beallsville
 Boyds
 Derwood
 Dickerson
 Hyattstown
 Sandy Spring

See also

 Flag of Montgomery County, Maryland
 Montgomery County, Maryland Agricultural Reserve
 National Register of Historic Places listings in Montgomery County, Maryland

Explanatory notes

References

External links

 
 
 
 
 
 

 
1776 establishments in Maryland
Maryland counties
Populated places established in 1776
Maryland counties on the Potomac River
Washington metropolitan area
Slave cabins and quarters in the United States
Majority-minority counties and independent cities in Maryland